WXND-LP (107.3 FM) was a radio station licensed to serve Etna, New Hampshire, United States.

The station aired an adult album alternative music format. Notable programming included a dance/trace mix show which aired each Friday night on both WXND-LP and WXGR-LP.

The station was assigned the WXND-LP call letters by the Federal Communications Commission on July 31, 2003.

WXND stopped broadcasting in late January 2008 due to what the station's website described as "unfavorable business circumstances". The station's license was cancelled and the callsign deleted from the FCC database on June 3, 2008.

References

External links
 

XND-LP
XND-LP
Radio stations established in 2004
Defunct radio stations in the United States
Radio stations disestablished in 2008
Hanover, New Hampshire
2004 establishments in New Hampshire
2008 disestablishments in New Hampshire
XND-LP